Krasnolipye is a rural locality (a selo) and the administrative center of Krasnolipyevskoye Rural Settlement, Repyovsky District, Voronezh Oblast, Russia. The population was 1,539 as of 2010. There are 13 streets.

Geography 
Krasnolipye is located 18 km northeast of Repyovka (the district's administrative centre) by road. Novosoldatka is the nearest rural locality.

References 

Rural localities in Repyovsky District